Nevada is a 1997 film starring Amy Brenneman and directed by Gary Tieche.

Plot 
Chrysty, a woman with a past who arrives on foot to the small town of Silver City, Nevada. There, she meets the women of the town, all but one of whom accept her. However, McGill, is suspicious, and doesn't stop until she discovers Chrysty's past.

McGill finds out Chrysty's telephone number, and calls her home, to find out that Chrysty left behind her husband and three children in Idaho. She tells her husband where she is so he can come and pick her up. Meanwhile, Chrysty, who had planned on continuing on, finds herself settling into the town, getting a job and a house. When her husband arrives with the children, she explains why she ran away, and they all accept that and go home. At that time, Chrysty also decides to move on, and leaves behind her new friends.

Cast
 Amy Brenneman as Chrysty
 Ben Browder as Shelby
 James Wilder as Rip
 Keith Anthony Bennett as Nate
 Kirstie Alley as McGill
 Bridgette Wilson as June
 Gabrielle Anwar as Linny
 Saffron Burrows as Quinn
 Kathy Najimy as Ruth
 Dee Wallace as Ruby
 Barbara Burton as Katie
 Emily Miller as Melanie
 Rachel Reber as Paula
 Charlie Crandell as Kimberly 
 David Darmstaeder as Derrick 
 Jordan Craddock as Derrick Jr.
 Garette Ratliff Henson as Weston
 Nathan Garcia as Cody
 Angus MacFadyen as West

External links 
 
 
 

1997 films
1997 drama films
American drama films
1990s feminist films
Films set in Nevada
1990s English-language films
1990s American films